The 1988 Wisconsin Badgers football team represented the University of Wisconsin–Madison in the 1988 NCAA Division I-A football season.

Schedule

Roster

1989 NFL Draft

References

Wisconsin
Wisconsin Badgers football seasons
Wisconsin Badgers football